is a Japanese games developer specialising in otome games for Windows and consoles such as the PlayStation Portable. The company also produces drama CDs, manga, light novels, and other merchandise based on their games.

On September 25, 2015, Quinrose's parent company Artmove officially suspended business. Alleged reasons were the decline in sales due to the growing competitiveness in the marketplace, the growth of mobile games, and other factors. All games produced by Quinrose have ceased distribution since its business suspension.

Games
QuinRose has developed and produced the following:
 Arabians Lost: The Engagement on Desert
 Arabians Doubt: The Engagement on Desert
 Mother Goose no Himitsu no Yakata
 Mother Goose no Himitsu no Yakata ~Blue Label~ (remake with male protagonist)
 Mahoutsukai to Goshujin-sama ~wizard and the master~
 Mahoutsukai to Goshujin-sama ~wizard and the master~ New Ground(Remake with new artwork and fixed system)
 Heart no Kuni no Alice ~Wonderful Wonder World~
 Diamond no Kuni no Alice ~Wonderful Wonder World~
 Diamond no Kuni no Alice ~Wonderful Mirror World~
 Heart no Kuni no Alice ~Wonderful Wonder World~
 Joker no Kuni no Alice ~Wonderful Wonder World~ (side story)
 Clover no Kuni no Alice ~Wonderful Wonder World~
 Omochabako no Kuni no Alice ~Wonderful Wonder World~ (fandisc)
 Heart no Kuni no Alice ~Wonderful Twin World~ (fandisc)
 Anniversary no Kuni no Alice ~Wonderful Wonder World~ (remake of the original game)
 Crimson Empire ~Circumstances to Serve a Noble~
 Crimson Royale ~Circumstances to Serve a Noble~
 Okashi na Shima no Peter Pan ~Sweet Never Land~
 12 Ji no Kane to Cinderella ~Halloween Wedding~
 24 Ji no Kane to Cinderella ~Halloween Wedding~
 0 Ji no Kane to Cinderella ~Halloween Wedding~
 Kaidan Romance series
 Oumagatoki ~Kaidan Romance~
 Tasogaredoki ~Kaidan Romance~
 Hyakki Yakou ~Kaidan Romance~
 Hyaku Monogatari ~Kaidan Romance~
 Shinigami Kagyou ~Kaidan Romance~
 Shinigami Shogyou ~Kaidan Romance~
 Grimm the Bounty Hunter
 School Wars
 School Wars  ~Sotsugyou Sensen~
 Romeo VS Juliet
 Romeo & Juliet
 Taishou Kitan
 Taishou Kitan ~Kotonoha Sakuya~
 Kuroyuki Hime ~Snow Black~
 Kuroyuki Hime ~Snow Magic~
 Satomi Hakkenden
 Satomi Hakkenden Hamami Hime no Ki
 Satomi Hakkenden Murasamemaru no Ki
 Black Code
 Majo'ou
 Mermaid Gothic
 Genji Koi Emaki

PSP Port of Other Companies' Games
 Iza, Shutsujin! Koi ikusa  (originally an iOS game)
 Iza, Shutsujin! Koi ikusa Dainimaku
 Asaki, Yumemishi (originally a PC game by MIO)
 Abunai Koi no Souhashitsu (originally an iOS game)

References

External links
Official site

Video game companies of Japan
Video game development companies
Video game companies established in 2005
Japanese companies established in 2005